The Ararat River is a tributary of the Yadkin River in southwestern Virginia and northwestern North Carolina in the United States.  Via the Yadkin it is part of the watershed of the Pee Dee River, which flows to the Atlantic Ocean.

The Ararat River rises in the Blue Ridge Mountains in southwestern Patrick County, Virginia, and flows southwardly into Surry County, North Carolina, where it flows through the city of Mount Airy and joins the Yadkin River, about 5 mi (8 km) northwest of East Bend. The river is stocked with brown, brook, and rainbow trout.

Variant names
According to the Geographic Names Information System, it has also been known historically as:
Arrat River
Ararat Creek
Rentfro Creek
Rentfrows Creek
Tarrarat River

See also
List of North Carolina rivers
List of Virginia rivers

External links
 USGS Water Gauge at Ararat, North Carolina

References

Rivers of North Carolina
Rivers of Virginia
Rivers of Patrick County, Virginia
Rivers of Surry County, North Carolina
Tributaries of the Pee Dee River